The India-Pakistan Air War of 1965 is a 2005 aviation history book written by PVS Jagan Mohan and Samir Chopra. The book deals with the Indian Air Force's role in the Indo-Pakistani War of 1965 that started on 1 September 1965 and came to an end on 23 September 1965.

Background
The air war was one of the last in which classic turning dogfights took place between the two belligerents. The Pakistan Air Force employed largely American hardware. The North American F-86 Sabre, the Lockheed F-104 Starfighter and the Martin B-57 Canberra (based on the British aircraft the English Electric Canberra). The Indian Air Force employed British, French & Russian aircraft like the Hawker Hunter, Folland Gnat, Canberra, de Havilland Vampire, MiG-21 and Dassault Mystere 

The book describes the day-to-day operations of the Indian Air Force and is the first detailed account of the airwar from the Indian side.

Reviews
Some reviews of the Book are available on the authors' web site  at BharatRakshak.com.
Review on Frontier India Journal

Further reading
The Class of '65 – Excerpts from Indian Express by Rakesh Sinha and Shiv Aroor
On a wing and a prayer – Excerpt from Rediff.com
The Wolfpack in action – Excerpt from Rediff.com

Aviation history of India
2005 books
Indo-Pakistani War of 1965
Aviation in India
Aviation in Pakistan